The Australian Professional Championship was a professional snooker tournament which was open only for Australian or Australian-based players.

History
From 1963 to 1974 the Australian Professional Championship was held on a challenge basis and dominated by Eddie Charlton who won ten times in that period. It became a knockout tournament in 1975. It was then not held until 1984 when the WPBSA offered a subsidy of £1,000 per man to any country holding a national professional championship. This subsidy ended in 1988/1989 after which date most national championships were discontinued.

Eddie Charlton won the tournament on a record 20 occasions.

Winners

Notes

See also

Cue sports in Australia

References

Australian Professional Championship
Snooker non-ranking competitions
Defunct snooker competitions
Snooker competitions in Australia